Blackwater Creek travels through part of Hillsborough County, Florida. It is a tributary of the Hillsborough River.

The Blackwater Creek Preserve, a 1,200 acre conservation area, protects a section of it in this area. The preserve includes trails.

References

Rivers of Florida
Rivers of Hillsborough County, Florida